OpenJPEG is an open-source library to encode and decode JPEG 2000 images. As of version 2.1 released in April 2014, it is officially conformant with the JPEG 2000 Part-1 standard. It was subsequently adopted by ImageMagick instead of JasPer in 6.8.8-2 and approved as new reference software for this standard in July 2015. OpenJPEG is a fork of libj2k, a JPEG-2000 codec library written by David Janssens during his master thesis at University of Louvain (UCLouvain) in 2001.

Unlike JasPer, another open-source JPEG 2000 implementation, OpenJPEG fully respects the JPEG 2000 specification and can compress and decompress lossless 16-bit images.

See also 
 Grok (JPEG 2000)
 Kakadu library

References

External links
 
 Communications and Remote Sensing Lab
 Digital Signal Processing Lab (DSPLab)
 intoPIX - JPEG2000 FPGA/ASIC IP-cores solutions

JPEG
C (programming language) libraries
Graphics libraries